Fruitland is an unincorporated community in San Juan County, New Mexico, United States, on the north side of the San Juan River. It is immediately west of central Kirtland and north across the river from the Navajo Nation and Upper Fruitland. Fruitland is east of Waterflow.

Fruitland shares its name with a geological formation, the Fruitland Formation.

History
The area now known as Fruitland was traditional Navajo territory.  This place is called Bááh Díílid in Navajo.

Euro-American settlers were allowed in 1877, and members of the Church of Jesus Christ of Latter-day Saints first settled in the area in 1878 and an organized group of settlers was sent there by the church in 1881 with Luther C. Burnham being prominent among them.  Burnham was made bishop of the LDS ward there in 1883, which was named the Burnham Ward.  From this time until the 1930s most of the residents called the area Burnham instead of Fruitland.

For a time Brigham Young, Jr. maintained one of his residences at Fruitland.

In 1930 the Burnham Ward had 718 members, including unbaptized children under age eight.

The Young Stake was organized with headquarters at Burnham in 1912.  By the 1970s the stake headquarters was Farmington.  In 1982 a Kirtland Stake was formed, which today covers from Kirtland west to Shiprock, New Mexico, and beyond.

Population history
Fruitland had about 400 people in 1950 according to the Columbia-Lippincott Gazetteer.  Other sources place the population at this point at 200.

Education
It is within Central Consolidated Schools.

Notable people from Fruitland
 Mamie Deschillie, artist
 Jay Foutz (professional trader)

Notes

Populated places established in 1878
Unincorporated communities in San Juan County, New Mexico
Unincorporated communities in New Mexico
1878 establishments in New Mexico Territory